Billion Dollar Sound is the first and only studio solo album by former / late LFO vocalist, Rich Cronin. The album was released on May 16, 2008. The album was three years in the making and includes music which chronicles his journey from "Summer Girls" to now. The label of the album is Orange Freeze Records; Cronin wrote many of the songs on the album.

Track listing 
"This Year" – 4:26 Rich Cronin, Thomas Cangemi, Jos Clapp
"Impossible" – 3:34
"Hey Radio" – 4:13
"Watch Your Dance" – 3:13
"Story of My Life" – 3:18
"The Only One" – 3:29
"Wish" – 4:14
"Waiting Outside" – 3:56
"Holiday Inn" – 3:20
"Blur" – 3:35
"Nothing Last Forever" – 4:12
"Tara Reid" – 2:46
"On Your Side" – 4:01 Rich Cronin, Thomas Cangemi, Jos Clapp
"Star" – 3:27
"Great Mistake" – 4:11 Rich Cronin, Thomas Cangemi, Jos Clapp
"Little Sister" – 3:33 Rich Cronin, Thomas Cangemi, Jos Clapp
"The Kill" – 2:48
"New York City Girls" – 3:53

References

2008 debut albums
Rich Cronin albums